Togo–United States relations are bilateral relations between Togo and the United States.

Diplomatic relations
Togo is a pro-Western, market-oriented country. The United States and Togo have had generally good relations since its independence, although the United States has never been one of Togo's major trading partners. The largest share of U.S. exports to Togo generally has been used clothing and scrap textiles. Other important U.S. exports include rice, wheat, shoes, and tobacco products, and U.S. personal computers and other office electronics are becoming more widely used.

The Government of Togo, with the support of the Overseas Private Investment Corporation (OPIC) and the United States Agency for International Development (USAID), established an export processing zone (EPZ) in Togo in 1989. The zone has attracted private investors interested in manufacturing, assembly, and food processing, primarily for the export market. USAID closed its local office in 1994 and runs local development programs from its office in Accra through nongovernmental organizations in Togo.

The Peace Corps began its work in Togo in 1962. Since that time, more than 2,200 Peace Corps Volunteers have served in the country. Currently there are 114 Volunteers serving in Togo. Volunteers have a successful history of collaboration and involvement with the Togolese people at all levels. Their efforts build upon counterpart relationships and emphasize low-cost solutions that make maximum use of local resources. Partnering with local and international organizations is an important component of Volunteer project activities. Volunteers work to promote self-sufficiency in the areas of small business development, education, environment, and health. All Volunteers, regardless of sector, are trained in how to promote HIV/AIDS awareness and prevention.

Resident diplomatic missions
 Togo has an embassy in Washington, D.C.
 United States has an embassy in Lomé.

See also 
 Embassy of Togo, Washington, D.C.
 Foreign relations of Togo
 Foreign relations of the United States
 United States Ambassador to Togo

References

External links
 History of Togo - U.S. relations
 U.S. Embassy in Togo

 
Bilateral relations of the United States
United States